Minchina Ota is a 1980 Indian Kannada language heist film directed by and starring Shankar Nag with his brother Anant Nag and Lokanath in pivotal roles. The supporting cast features Priya Tendulkar and Ramesh Bhat, who made his debut in the film.

The film was a critical success and won multiple awards at the 1979–80 Karnataka State Film Awards including Second Best Film, Best Actor (Anant Nag) and Best Supporting Actor (Lokanath). It is seen as a milestone in the careers of the Nag brothers. It was remade in Hindi in 1983 by Shankar Nag himself as Lalach starring Vinod Mehra, Ranjit and Pran alongside Anant Nag with music by Bappi Lahiri. Minchina Ota is considered one of the finest movies in the history of Kannada cinema. It's also a milestone movie in the career of Nag brothers.

Plot 
Katte (Shankar Nag) and Prabhakar Rao / Tatha (Loknath) are petty thieves who can't seem to get a break in life. Their criminal past does not leave them wherever they go. To make it big, they resort to their past and start jumping unsuspecting passers by on National Highways and relieving them of their automobiles. Disassembling the auto parts, they sell them for money and often duping people on their way.

Soon their jig is up when one of their stolen vehicles breaks down and a mechanic Tony D'Souza (Anant Nag) is brought for help. Seeing that money is a free flowing concept in this criminal life, Tony joins hands with this crime duo. Soon the trio is hitting various spots and making away with vehicles. During this process, they even manage to rope in another petty thief Manju (Priya Tendulkar), who is thieving to meet her sick mother's medical bills, into their criminal enterprise. Soon, Tony and Manju get married.

The cops are hot on their trail for a good part of the film before finally clamping the trio down much to the delight of the pipe-smoking Inspector Nayak (Ramesh Bhat). As jailbirds, Katte and Thatha seem to have found their peace but not Tony. His desperate self is trying to get away from the chains that bind him. A prison break is planned and executed to almost perfection by the three. In the process, Tatha dies after accidentally falling off the high prison walls. Katte and Tony are killed in an encounter while trying to flee from the cops. The film ends with Manju, who at this stage is pregnant by Tony, vowing to raise the child in a good and healthy environment.

Cast 
 Anant Nag as Tony D'Souza
 Shankar Nag as Katte
 Lokanath as Prabhakar Rao / Thatha
 Priya Tendulkar as Manju
 Ramesh Bhat as Inspector Nayak
 Mandeep Roy as Constable Thimmaiah
 Prakash 
 B. R. Shivaramaiah
 Mysore Nagaraj
 Ranga
 Basavaraj Vali

Soundtrack

Prabhakar Badri composed the soundtrack for the film with lyrics written by Rudramurthy Shastry. The album consists of four soundtracks.

Awards
Karnataka State Film Awards 1979-80

 Second Best Film - Anant Nag and Shankar Nag
 Best Actor – Anant Nag
 Best Supporting Actor – Lokanath
 Best Screenplay – Mariyam Jetpurawala, Shankar Nag
 Best Cinematographer – B. C. Gowrishankar
 Best Editor – P. Bhaktavatsalam
 Best Sound Recording – S. P. Ramanathan

28th Filmfare Awards South

 Best Director — Shankar Nag

References

External links 
 

1980 films
1980s heist films
1980s Kannada-language films
Indian heist films
Kannada films remade in other languages
Films directed by Shankar Nag